Biathlon Canada is the governing federation for biathlon in Canada.

References

External links

See also
 Canadian Snowboard Federation, Canadian snowboard sports federation
 Canadian Freestyle Ski Association, Canadian freestyle skiing sports federation
 Nordic Combined Ski Canada, Canadian Nordic combined skiing sports federation
 Ski Jumping Canada, Canadian ski jumping sports federation
 Cross Country Canada, Canadian cross country skiing sports federation
 Alpine Canada, Canadian alpine skiing sports federation

Biathlon in Canada
Nordic
Biathlon organizations